The fundiform ligament or fundiform ligament of the penis is a specialization or thickening of the superficial (Scarpa's) fascia extending from the linea alba of the lower abdominal wall.

It runs from the level of the pubic bone, laterally around the sides of the penis like a sling, and then unites at the base of the penis before going to the septum of the scrotum.

It is just superficial to the suspensory ligament.

Although rarely mentioned, this ligament is also found in females.

External links
  - "Anterior Abdominal Wall: Layers of the Superficial Fascia"
  - "The Male Perineum and the Penis: The Fundiform Ligament"
 

Mammal male reproductive system
Ligaments
Sexual anatomy